Brendan Joseph McArdle (born 2 March 1952) is a former Australia first-class cricketer. McArdle played as a right-handed batsman who bowled right-arm medium-fast. He was born in Melbourne, Victoria.

McArdle made his first-class cricket debut for Victoria against South Australia in the 1976–77 Sheffield Shield. He made 10 further first-class appearances for Victoria, the last coming against Tasmania in the 1978–79 Sheffield Shield. An all-rounder, McArdle scored 339 runs at an average of 30.81.  He made three half centuries, with a high score of 78. This came against South Australia on debut. With the ball, McArdle took 13 wickets at a bowling average of 43.00, with best figures of 3/40. An infrequent player for Victoria, the 1978–79 season was his last for the state.

In the early 1980s, McArdle played for a number of teams in the Lancashire League as a professional. He also played for Staffordshire County Cricket Club, making his debut against Hertfordshire in the 1984 Minor Counties Championship. He made his List A cricket debut for the county against Gloucestershire, scoring 37 runs. McArdle continued to feature in the Lancashire League, returning to Staffordshire to play his second and final List A match against Glamorgan in the 1989 NatWest Trophy.

References

External links

1952 births
Living people
Cricketers from Melbourne
Australian cricketers
Victoria cricketers
Staffordshire cricketers